Commandant Dame Nancy Margaret Robertson,  (1 March 1909 – 26 December 2000) was a senior British naval officer who served as Director of the Women's Royal Naval Service from 1954 to 1958.

Early life
Robertson was born on 1 March 1909 to The Revd William Cowper Robertson and his wife Jessie Katharine Robertson ( McGregor). She was educated at Esdaile School in Edinburgh. From 1928 to 1939, having left school, she worked as a secretary in Paris and London.

Naval career
In 1939, Robertson joined the Women's Royal Naval Service (WRNS). During the Second World War, she served as a chief officer (equivalent in rank to commander) at the headquarters of the Commander-in-Chief, Western Approaches in Liverpool, England, and also on the staff of the Flag Officer Ceylon. In the 1946 King's Birthday Honours, Robertson was appointed an Officer of the Order of the British Empire.

After the war, Robertson served as the senior WRNS officer at Royal Naval Dockyard Rosyth, and the Assistant Director of WRNS with responsibility for welfare. Having been promoted to superintendent (equivalent to captain), she served as Superintendent (Air) and Superintendent (Training) and, in the 1953 Coronation Honours, was advanced to Commander of the Order of the British Empire.

In 1954, she was appointed Director of the Women's Royal Naval Service and promoted to commandant (equivalent to commodore). Appointed a Dame Commander of the Order of the British Empire in the 1957 New Year Honours, she retired from the military in 1958.

References

External links

 
 
 

1909 births
2000 deaths
Dames Commander of the Order of the British Empire
Military personnel from Edinburgh
Royal Navy personnel of World War II
Women's Royal Naval Service officers